Kenneth Rees Barton (20 September 1937 – 6 September 1982) was a Welsh professional footballer who played for Tottenham Hotspur, Millwall, Luton Town and Wales Schools in the position of full back. He was born in Caernarfon.

Football career 
Barton joined Spurs as a junior in October 1956 and made his first class debut in 1960. Playing a total of four times, he was one of seventeen players used in their Double winning season of 1960–61. Leaving the club in a transfer deal in September 1964 to join Millwall. He transferred to Luton Town where he made 11 appearances in 1964. Barton ended his career at Dunstable Town F.C.

See also 

Tottenham Hotspur F.C. season 1960–61

References

External links 
 
 Topspurs A-Z of players

1937 births
1982 deaths
People from Caernarfon
Sportspeople from Gwynedd
Welsh footballers
Tottenham Hotspur F.C. players
Millwall F.C. players
Luton Town F.C. players
English Football League players
Dunstable Town F.C. players
Association football defenders